Sulz (Ukrainian or ) was a village in Mykolaiv Raion of Mykolaiv Oblast in southern Ukraine.  It was located along the east bank of the Berezan River just to the southeast of the village of Landau.

The village was established in 1809 by Roman Catholic German immigrants to the Berezaner Valley, then part of the Kherson Governorate of the Russian Empire.  It was abandoned after the remaining German residents were driven from the area by the advancing Soviet army in 1944.

See also
 Black Sea Germans
 German evacuation from Central and Eastern Europe
 Josef Alois Kessler
 Shyrokolanivka
 Stepove, Mykolaiv Raion

External links
 Sulz Village Information
 Beresan Map
 Sulz, Beresan, Cherson, South Russia
 Beresan, Cherson, South Russia Map

Populated places established in 1809
Former German settlements in Mykolaiv Oblast
1809 establishments in Ukraine

Villages in Mykolaiv Raion, Mykolaiv Oblast